Oxford, Bodleian Library, Rawlinson B. 512 is an Irish vellum manuscript in quarto, numbering 154 folios and written in double columns by multiple scribes in the course of the late 15th and early 16th centuries. The compilation presents a diverse range of medieval texts in verse and in prose, some of which are in Latin, while the vast majority is written in the Irish language. It is a composite manuscript, consisting of five portions which were originally distinct volumes: I (fos. 101-22, 1-36, 45-52), II (fos. 53-75), III (fos. 75B-100, 37-44), IV (fos. 123-44) and V (fos. 145-54).

Contents

Sources

Secondary sources
Stokes, Whitley. The Tripartite Life of St. Patrick. London, 1887.

Further reading

Best, R.I. "Notes on Rawlinson B. 512." ZCP 17 (1928): 389-402.
Meyer, Kuno (ed.). Hibernica Minora. Anecdota Oxoniensia. Oxford: Clarendon Press, 1894. Supplement (pp. ) to Stokes' description.
Ó Cuív, Brian. Catalogue of Irish Language Manuscripts in the Bodleian Library at Oxford and Oxford College Libraries. Part I. Dublin, 2001. No. 38, pp. 223–54.

External links
MS Rawlinson B. 512 Images available on Digital Bodleian.
MS Rawlinson B. 512 in the Bodleian Libraries' catalogue of Medieval manuscripts

Irish manuscripts
Bodleian Library collection
Irish-language literature